Herington is a surname. Notable people with the surname include:

Jon Herington (born 1954), American musician
Leigh Herington, American politician
Marieve Herington, Canadian actress and singer

Fictional characters:
Tjokkie Herington, character in the South African films Heel Against the Head and Running Riot

See also
Herrington (surname)
Herrington (disambiguation)